The 2018 California State Board of Equalization elections were held on Tuesday, November 6, 2018. The primary elections was held on June 5, 2018. All four seats on the State Board of Equalization were contested.

The board's members serve four-year terms and are limited to serving two terms.

A nonpartisan blanket primary was used for the election, starting with the primary in June. The top-two primary finishers in each district, regardless of party, advanced to the general election in November. Republicans lost one seat to the Democrats, leaving only one Republican board member remaining.

Overview

Overall results

By district
Results of the 2018 California state Board of Equalization election by district:

Close races
Seats where the margin of victory was under 5%:

Detailed results

District 1
The incumbent was Republican George Runner, who was term-limited and ineligible to run for reelection. Runner was succeeded by Republican Ted Gaines.

Results

Red represents counties won by Gaines. Blue represents counties won by Hallinan.

District 2
The incumbent was Democrat Fiona Ma, who was elected state treasurer. Ma was succeeded by Democrat Malia Cohen.

Results

Blue represents counties won by Cohen. Red represents counties won by Burns.

District 3
The incumbent was Democrat Jerome Horton, who was term-limited and ineligible to run for reelection. Horton was succeeded by Democrat Tony Vazquez.

Results

Blue represents counties won by Vazquez. Red represents counties won by Marshall.

District 4
The incumbent was Republican Diane Harkey, who retired to run for California's 49th congressional district. Harkey was succeeded by Democrat Mike Schaefer, giving Democrats a majority on the Board of Equalization.

Endorsements

Results

Blue represents counties won by Schaefer. Red represents counties won by Anderson.

References

External links
Official campaign websites for first district candidates
Ted Gaines (R) for State Board of Equalization
Tom Hallinan (D) for State Board of Equalization

Official campaign websites for second district candidates
Mark Burns for State Board of Equalization
Malia Cohen (D) for State Board of Equalization

Official campaign websites for third district candidates
G. Rick Marshall (R) for State Board of Equalization
Tony Vazquez (D) for State Board of Equalization

Official campaign websites of fourth district candidates
Mike Schaefer (D) for State Board of Equalization

State Board of Equalization
California state constitutional officer elections
California State Board of Equalization